Vahdat is a city in western Tajikistan, on the bank of the Kofarnihon River, 21 km east of Dushanbe. It was previously called Yangi-Bozor (1927–1936), Orjonikidzeobod (1936–1993, after Grigoriy Ordzhonikidze) and Kofarnihon (1993–2006). Its population is estimated at 43,200 for the city proper and 342,700 for the city with the outlying communities (2020). Vahdat was the focus on international attention in 2019 when a riot occurred in the city's prison, believed to be instigated by members of Islamic State, which led to the deaths of three guards and 29 inmates.

Geography 
The city is located in the upper basin of the river Kofarnihon, and is near the Gissar Range (southern slopes) and the Karategin Range (northern slopes), to the west, the city is on the edge of the Gissar Valley.

Subdivisions
Before ca. 2018, Vahdat was the seat of Vahdat District, which covered the rural part of the present city of Vahdat. The city of Hisor covers Hisor proper, the town Nu'mon Roziq and ten jamoats. These are as follows:

Demographics 
The population is composed primarily of Tajiks and Uzbeks, with small numbers of Russians and Tatars.  Numbers of Afghan refugees have also made Vahdat home.

Economy 
The city's economy is mainly shaped by the surrounding district's agricultural activities: cotton, cattle, grains and vegetable production, and viticulture, with cotton-ginning being the city's dominant industrial activity.

Transportation 
There are road and rail connections between Vahdat and Dushanbe. Vahdat's railway station was built in 1930. Highway connections are possible to Jirgatol, Khorog, Kulob, Nurak and Yovon.

Education 

The Vahdat Statistical College specializes in courses on finance, accounting and economics.

Infrastructure 
Vahdat is the location of a prison which included those convicted of terrorist crimes, mainly associated with membership in Islamic State (ISIS/ISIL) and the Islamic Renaissance Party of Tajikistan (IRPT).  In 2019, a prison riot saw three guards and 29 inmates killed, 24 of whom were said to be Islamic militants. One of the those killed was Behruz Gulmurod, a son of Gulmurod Halimov, previously a commander of Tajik Interior Ministry special forces who joined ISIS/ISIL in 2015.

Climate

References

Populated places in Districts of Republican Subordination